The Siyer-i Nebi is an Ottoman Turkish epic on the life of Muhammad, completed around 1388, written by Mustafa (son of Yusuf of Erzurum, known as al-Darir), a Mevlevi dervish on the commission of Sultan Barquq, the Mamluk ruler in Cairo. The text is based on the 13th-century writings of Abu’l Hasan al-Bakri and Ibn Hisham (d. 833). This epic would later be illustrated by Mustafa ibn Vali in the late 16th century by his patron, Sultan Murad III.

Ottoman manuscript 
The Ottoman ruler Murad III (1574–1595) commissioned a lavish illustrated copy of the epic, which has been described as "the largest single cycle of religious painting in Islamic art" and "the most complete visual portrayal of the life of the prophet Muhammad". The famous calligrapher Lutfi Abdullah (Lütfi Abdullah) was in charge of the workshop at the royal palace, and completed the work under Murad's successor Mehmed III, on 16 January 1595. The completed work contained 814 miniatures in six volumes, which include many depictions of Muhammad, who is always shown with a veiled face, as was the convention during the time period; he is also surrounded by flames, which is the eastern equivalent of a halo. The style of the miniatures is distinctive, and owes nothing to earlier treatments of these subjects, as well as being "strikingly different" to the normal realist style of Ottoman miniatures; its origins remain unclear. There are a few figures in each scene, no extensive landscapes, and a "suppression of detail".

Volumes I, II and VI are in the Topkapı Museum (Hazine 1221–1223); Volume III is in the New York Public Library; Volume IV is (mostly) in the Chester Beatty Library in Dublin (MS T 419), and Volume V is missing, as are about 200 of the miniatures in total. About two dozen of the miniatures are in the hands of private collectors. Four were sold at the Hôtel Drouot auction house in Paris in March 1984. Two folios from Volume IV are in the Khalili Collection of Islamic Art.

A 17th century copy of Volume IV, made in the court atelier, is in the Museum of Turkish and Islamic Arts, Sultanahmet, Istanbul. It was donated to a mosque library in Aksaray, Istanbul, by the Sultan's mother in 1862–1863.

Images gallery

Notes

References
Antika, The Turkish Journal of Collectible Art, June 1986
Blair, Sheila, and Bloom, Jonathan M., The Art and Architecture of Islam, 1250–1800, 1995, Yale University Press Pelican History of Art, 
Fisher, Carol Garrett, "A Reconstruction of the Pictorial Cycle of the "Siyar-i Nabī" of Murād III", Ars Orientalis, Vol. 14, (1984), pp. 75–94, Freer Gallery of Art and University of Michigan, JSTOR

External links 

Biographies of Muhammad
Turkish books
16th-century illuminated manuscripts
Illuminated histories
Islamic illuminated manuscripts
Manuscripts in the Chester Beatty Library
Manuscripts in the New York Public Library